Management consulting is the practice of providing consulting services to organizations to improve their performance or in any way to assist in achieving organizational objectives. Organizations may draw upon the services of management consultants for a number of reasons, including gaining external (and presumably objective) advice and accessing consultants' specialized expertise regarding concerns that call for additional oversight. 

As a result of their exposure to and relationships with numerous organizations, consulting firms are typically aware of industry "best practices". However, the specific nature of situations under consideration may limit the ability or appropriateness of transferring such practices from one organization to another. Management consulting is an additional service to internal management functions and, for various legal and practical reasons, may not be seen as a replacement for internal management. Unlike interim management, management consultants do not become part of the organization to which they provide services.

Consultancies provide organizational change-management assistance, development of coaching skills, process analysis, technology implementation, strategy development, or operational improvement services.  Management consultants often bring their own proprietary methodologies or frameworks to guide the identification of problems and to serve as the basis for recommendations with a view to more effective or efficient ways of performing work tasks.

History 
Management consulting grew with the rise of management, as a unique field of study.  One of the first management consulting firms was Arthur D. Little Inc., founded in 1886 as a partnership, and later incorporated in 1909. Although Arthur D. Little later became a general management consultancy, it originally specialised in technical research.

As Arthur D. Little focused on technical research for the first few years, the first management consultancy was that of Frederick Winslow Taylor, who in 1893 opened an independent consulting practice in Philadelphia. His business card read "Consulting Engineer – Systematizing Shop Management and Manufacturing Costs a Specialty". By inventing Scientific Management, also known as Taylor's method, Frederick Winslow Taylor invented the first method of organizing work, spawning the careers of many more management consultants. For example, one of Taylor's early collaborators, Morris Llewellyn Cooke, opened his own management consultancy in 1905. Taylor's method was used worldwide until industry switched to a method invented by W. Edwards Deming.

The initial period of growth in the consulting industry was triggered by the Glass–Steagall Banking Act in the 1930s, and was driven by demand for advice on finance, strategy and organization. From the 1950s onwards, consultancies expanded their activities considerably in the United States, and also opened offices in Europe and later in Asia and South America. After World War II, a number of new management consulting firms were formed, bringing a rigorous analytical approach to the study of management and strategy. The postwar years also saw the application of cybernetics principles to management through the work of Stafford Beer.

The management consulting firms Stern Stewart, Marakon Associates, and Alcar pioneered value-based management (VBM), or "managing for value", in the 1980s based on the academic work of Joel Stern, Dr. Bill Alberts, and Professor Alfred Rappaport. Other consulting firms including McKinsey and BCG developed VBM approaches. Value-based management became prominent during the late 1980s and 1990s.

The industry experienced significant growth in the 1980s and 1990s, gaining considerable importance in relation to national gross domestic product. In 1980 there were only five consulting firms with more than 1,000 consultants worldwide, whereas by the 1990s there were more than thirty firms of this size.

A period of significant growth in the early 1980s was driven by demand for strategy and organization consultancies. The wave of growth in the 1990s was driven by both strategy and information technology advice. In the second half of the 1980s, the big accounting firms entered the IT consulting segment. The then Big Eight, now Big Four, accounting firms (PricewaterhouseCoopers, KPMG, Ernst & Young and Deloitte Touche Tohmatsu) had always offered advice in addition to their traditional services, but after the late 1980s these activities became increasingly important in relation to the maturing market of accounting and auditing. By the mid-1990s these firms had outgrown those service providers focusing on corporate strategy and organization. While three of the Big Four legally divided the different service lines after the Enron scandal and the ensuing breakdown of Arthur Andersen, they are now back in the consulting business. In 2000, Andersen Consulting broke off from Arthur Andersen and announced their new name Accenture. The name change was effective starting January 1, 2001, and Accenture is currently the largest consulting firm in the world in employee headcount. They are publicly traded on the NYSE with ticker ACN.

The industry stagnated in 2001 before recovering after 2003 and then enjoying a period of sustained double-digit annual revenue growth until the financial crisis of 2007–2008. As financial services and government were two of the largest spenders on consulting services, the financial crash and the resulting public sector austerity drives hit consulting revenues hard. In some markets such as the UK there was a recession in the consulting industry, something which had never happened before or since. There has been a gradual recovery in the consulting industry's growth rate in the intervening years, with a current trend towards a clearer segmentation of management consulting firms. In recent years, management consulting firms actively recruit top graduates from Ivy League universities, Rhodes Scholars, and students from top MBA programs.

In more recent times, traditional management consulting firms have had to face increasing challenges from disruptive online marketplaces that are aiming to cater to the increasing number of freelance management consulting professionals.

Function 
The functions of consulting services are commonly broken down into eight task categories. Consultants can function as bridges for information and knowledge, and external consultants can provide these bridging services more economically than client firms themselves. Consultants can be engaged proactively, without significant external enforcement, and reactively, with external pressure. Proactive consultant engagement is engaged mainly with aim to find hidden weak spots and improve performance, while the reactive consultant engagement is mostly aimed at solving problems identified by external stakeholders.

Marvin Bower, McKinsey's long-term director, has mentioned the benefits of a consultant's externality, that they have varied experience outside the client company.

Management consulting could be classified into two categories:
 General management consulting, which concerns strategy, corporate finance, organization, environmental social and corporate governance, risk and compliance, and so forth. It entails questions that are relevant to the entirety of the client organization as a whole, on a management level.
 Specialized management consulting, which concerns questions that are specific to a certain function or subset of the client organization, such as legal management consulting, financial management consulting, digital management consulting, technology management consulting, operations management consulting, contract mobilisation and so forth.

Management consulting often involves a mix of both of these categories.

Consultants have specialised skills on tasks that would involve high internal coordination costs for clients, such as organization-wide changes or the implementation of information technology. In addition, because of economies of scale, consultants' focus on and experience in gathering information worldwide and across industries makes their research less costly than it is for clients to perform themselves.

Trends

Big Three management consultancies 

Three consulting firms are widely regarded as the Big Three or MBB:
McKinsey & Company
Boston Consulting Group
Bain & Company

Big Four accounting firms in the management consulting market 

The Big Four audit firms (Deloitte, KPMG, PwC, Ernst & Young) have been working in the strategy consulting market since 2010. In 2013, Deloitte acquired Monitor Group—now Monitor Deloitte—while PwC acquired PRTM in 2011 and Booz & Company in 2013—now Strategy&. From 2010 to 2013, several Big Four firms have tried to acquire Roland Berger. EY followed the trend, with acquisitions of The Parthenon Group in 2014, and both the BeNeLux and French businesses of OC&C in 2016 and 2017, with all now under the EY-Parthenon brand.

Deloitte has been named as the largest consulting firm for six years running as per Gartner's annual consulting report. Deloitte Consulting is broken up into five practices: Strategy, Analytics and M&A, Customer & Marketing, Core Business Operations, Human Capital, Enterprise Technology & Performance. They have been ranked #4 on Vault's 2020, 2019, 2018, 2017 and 2016 rankings for consulting firms.

Trends 
In 2013, an article in Harvard Business Review discussed the prevalent trends within the consulting industry to evolve. The authors noted that with knowledge being democratized and information becoming more and more accessible to anyone, the role of management consultants is rapidly changing. Moreover, with more online platforms that connect business executives to relevant consultants, the role of the traditional 'firm' is being questioned.

Government consultants

United Kingdom 
In the UK, the use of external management consultants within government has sometimes been contentious due to perceptions of variable value for money.  For instance, from 1997 to 2006, the UK government reportedly spent £20 billion on management consultants, raising questions in the House of Commons as to the returns upon such investment.

The UK has also experimented with providing longer-term use of management consultancy techniques provided internally, particularly to the high-demand consultancy arenas of local government and the National Health Service; the Local Government Association's Improvement and Development Agency and the public health national support teams; both generated positive feedback at cost levels considered a fraction of what external commercial consultancy input would have incurred.

Europe 
European Standard EN 16114:2011 "Management consultancy services".

Romania 
In 2011, the Romanian management consulting industry began to re-initiate growth after a period of economic stagnation. At the end of 2010, a majority of Romania's management consultancies had experienced declining profits and by the end of 2011 about 70% of them had noted shrinking bottom lines. The years 2010 and 2011 represented an important test for many Romanian consulting firms according to a European Federation of Management Consultancies Associations (FEACO) study.

In 2015, Romanian management consulting had a turnover of 350 Mln. € and an export of 10% of the overall turnover, 75% within the EU and 25% outside. The local leader of the Romanian management consulting market is Ensight Management Consulting.

Australia

In 1988, the newly elected Greiner State Government commissioned a report into the State Rail Authority by Booz Allen Hamilton. The resulting report recommended up to 8,000 job losses, including the withdrawal of staff from 94 country railway stations, withdrawing services on the Nyngan- Bourke line, Queanbeyan – Cooma line and Glen Innes- Wallangarra line, the discontinuation of several country passenger services (the Canberra XPT, the Silver City Comet to Broken Hill and various diesel locomotive hauled services) and the removal of sleeper trains from services to Brisbane and Melbourne. The report also recommended the removal of all country passenger services and small freight operations, but the government did not consider this to be politically feasible. The SRA was divided into business units – CityRail, responsible for urban railways; CountryLink, responsible for country passenger services; FreightRail, responsible for freight services; and Rail Estate, responsible for rail property.

New Zealand 
In New Zealand the government has historically had a greater role in providing some infrastructure and services than in some other countries.  Contributing reasons included insufficient scale in the private sector, smaller capital markets and historic political support for government service provision.  Current infrastructure investment plans are open to a range of public/private partnerships.  New Zealand governments hire in expertise to complement the advice of professional public servants.  While management consultants contribute to policy and to strategy development, the Government tends to use management consultants for strategic review and for strategy execution.  There is a distinction between management consultants (who generally provide advice and fixed deliverables, often for a fixed fee) and professional contractors (who work for an hourly or daily rate providing specialist services).  Official figures from 2007 to 2009 show annual expenditure of about NZ$150 to NZ$180 Million by the New Zealand Government on consultants, but this may be understated.  While multinational consultancy firms provide advice on major projects and in specialist areas, the majority of management consultants providing advice to the New Zealand government operate as sole practitioners or as members of small consultancy practices. The range of services provided is large, covering change management, strategic review, project and programme management, procurement, organizational design, etc.

Nonprofit consultants 
Some for-profit consulting firms, including McKinsey and BCG, offer consulting services to nonprofits at subsidized rates as a form of corporate social responsibility. Other for-profit firms have spun off nonprofit consulting organizations, e.g. Bain creating Bridgespan.

Many firms outside of the Big Three offer management consulting services to nonprofits, philanthropies, and mission-driven organizations. Some, but not all, are nonprofits themselves.

Liability 
As with all client-contractor work, liability depends heavily on the subject of contract terms. While the management consulting service provider for obvious reasons has a business reputation to protect, legally there is little protection for the client. This is due to the scope of the contract being the only thing subject to potential insurance claims as well as lawsuits.

As with other client-contractor relationships, settling for liabilities that exist outside the scope of the contract deliverables has been proven to be of considerable difficulty, also in management consulting. For this reason, it is important that clients procuring management consulting services think twice about what type of help they need, so that the scope, length and content of contract reflects such need.

Criticism 

Management consultants are sometimes criticized for the overuse of buzzwords, reliance on and propagation of management fads, and a failure to develop plans that are executable by the client.  As stated above management consulting is an unregulated profession so anyone or any company can style themselves as management consultants. A number of critical books about management consulting argue that the mismatch between management consulting advice and the ability of executives to actually create the change suggested results in substantial damages to existing businesses. In his book, Flawed Advice and the Management Trap, Chris Argyris believes that much of the advice given today has real merit. However, a close examination shows that most advice given today contains gaps and inconsistencies that may prevent positive outcomes in the future.

Ichak Adizes and coauthors also criticize the timing of consultant services. Client organizations, which are usually lacking the knowledge they want to obtain from the consultant, cannot correctly estimate the right timing for an engagement of consultants. Consultants are usually engaged too late when problems become visible to the top of the client's organizational pyramid. A proactive checkup, like a regular medical checkup, is recommended. On the other side, this opens additional danger for abuse from disreputable practitioners.

International standards 
ISO published the international standard ISO 20700 Guidelines for Management Consultancy Services on June 1, 2017, replacing EN 16114.

This document represents the first international standard for the management consultancy industry.

Training and certification 
An international qualification for a management consulting practitioner is Certified Management Consultant (CMC) available in the United States through the Institute of Management Consultants USA. Additional trainings and courses exist, often as part of a MBA training;
see .

See also 

 Big Three (management consultancies)
 Big Four accounting firms
 Business development
 Business process re-engineering
 Consultant
 Consulting firm
 ICMCI
 Industrial engineering
 Industrial psychology
 Institute of Consulting
 Knowledge economy
 Knowledge transfer
 Management cybernetics
 Management science
 Operations management
 Organizational development
 Organizational psychology
 Organizational studies
 Organizational theory
 Strategic management

References

Further reading

External links

 
consulting